János Sebestyén (2 March 19314 February 2012) was a Hungarian organist, harpsichordist, pianist and journalist.

Biography
János Sebestyén was born in Budapest, where both of his parents were prominent musicians and educators. His father, Sándor Sebestyén (1891-1962), studied cello with Adolf Schiffer and Arnold Földesy and was the author of several pedagogical works. His mother, Rózsi Mannaberg (1895-1986), studied piano with Arnold Székely and Wilhelm Backhaus.

His formal musical education began in 1946 at the State Music Secondary School as a student of pianist István Antal, organist János Hammerschlag and composer Ervin Major. He continued his studies with organist Ferenc Gergely and composer Ferenc Szabó at the Franz Liszt Academy of Music and graduated there with an organ diploma in 1955. He later attended the harpsichord class of Zuzana Růžičková in Prague. His concert tours as organ and harpsichord soloist took him to Russia, India, the Philippines, Taiwan, Japan, the United States and nearly every country in Europe.

In 1970 he established the first harpsichord class at the Franz Liszt Academy of Music. He was invited to serve on juries for organ and harpsichord competitions in France, the Czech Republic, Poland, Italy and Switzerland. In Hungary he served as President of the Jury for the International Liszt Organ Competition in 1983, 1988 and 1993, and at the 1st International Harpsichord Competition, Budapest, in 2000. From 1950 on, he worked for Hungarian Radio in various capacities, serving as senior music producer between 1969 and 1994, and from 1962 until 2007 he contributed a regular series of programs documenting culture, politics and history. During his last years he contributed a monthly program to Hungarian Catholic Radio.

Awards
 Erkel Prize, 1967 (Hungary)
 Liszt Prize, 1974 (Hungary)
 Artist of Merit, 1982 (Hungary)
 Grand Prix du Disque for the Hungaroton publication Bartók Record Archives, 1982 (France)
 Cavalier of the Italian Republic, 1984 (Italy)
 Grande Comendador of the Henrique Infante State Order, 1996 (Portugal)
 Officer of the Isabella la Católica Order, 1999 (Spain)
 Cavalier of the Order of the Southern Cross, 2000 (Brazil)
 Officer of the Royal Order of the Nordic Star, 2000 (Sweden)
 Officer's Cross, 2000 (Hungary)
 Ufficiale of the Italian Republic, 2003 (Italy)

Publications
 Rózsa Miklós: Életem történeteiből (Miklós Rózsa: Stories From My Life), Zeneműkiadó, Budapest, 1980; 
 Azok a rádiós évtizedek... / ...és azok a rádiós évek (Those Radio Decades... / ...Those Radio Years), co-authored with Jenő Randé, Ajtósi Dürer Kiadó, Budapest, 1995;

Recordings
János Sebestyén's discography spans most of the keyboard repertoire, from works by renaissance composer Valentin Bakfark through those by contemporary composers including Frank Martin and Paul Hindemith. More than 80 LP and CD recordings have been published by various labels including Angelicum, Ariston, Balkanton, BAM, Il Canale, CBS Italiana, Fonit Cetra, Hungaroton, Naxos, Supraphon, and Vox.

Highlights:
 Paul Hindemith: Organ Sonatas Nos. 1 and 3 - Angelicum LPA 5963
 J. S. Bach: Concertos after Alessandro Marcello, Georg Philipp Telemann, etc. - Angelicum STA 9015
 Melodie di Natale (Domenico Zipoli, Girolamo Frescobaldi, etc.) - Angelicum STA 9018
 Joseph Haydn: Six Esterházy Sonatas - BAM LD 6000
 Andrea Lucchesi: Twelve Organ Sonatas - IL Canale FC U09-10
 J. S. Bach: Harpsichord Toccatas - CBS Italiana/Odissea S 54079
 Bernardo Pasquini: Organ Works - Fonit Cetra/Italia ITL 70062
 Harpsichord Recital (J. S. Bach, Sergei Prokofiev, Frank Martin, Emil Petrovics) - Hungaroton LPX 1181
 Jean-Philippe Rameau: Pieces de Clavecin en Concerts - with flautist Lóránt Kovács and cellist László Mező - Hungaroton SLPX 11453
 Joseph Haydn: Five Divertimenti - with members of the Tátrai Quartet - Hungaroton SLPX 11458
 Arcangelo Corelli: Violin Sonatas - with violinist Dénes Kovács - Hungaroton SLPX 11514-15
 Harpsichord Concertos (Domenico Cimarosa, Carlos Seixas) - led by János Rolla - Hungaroton SLPX 12392
 George Frideric Handel: Violin Sonatas - with violinist György Pauk - Hungaroton SLPD 12657-58
 Johann Adolph Hasse: Six Organ Concertos - Hungaroton HCD 31738
 Music for Two Organs (Daniel Steibelt, Muzio Clementi, etc.) - with organist Miklós Spányi - Hungaroton HCD 32167
 W. A. Mozart: Organ Works - Naxos 8.550514
 J. S. Bach: Inventions and Sinfonias - Naxos 8.550679
 Various Composers: Organ Meditation - Naxos 8.550791
 João de Sousa Carvalho: Harpsichord Works - Portugalsom 860006
 J. S. Bach: Concertos for Two, Three, and Four Harpsichords - with harpsichordist Zuzana Růžičková et al. - Supraphon 1110 4391-92
 Polish Renaissance Music for Harpsichord and Organ (Jakob Polak, Wojciech Długoraj etc.) - Vox/Candide CE 31019
 Hungarian Dances for Harpsichord (Valentin Bakfark, Johann Babnik, etc.) - Vox/Candide CE 31032
 J. S. Bach: Six Concertos after Antonio Vivaldi - Vox/Turnabout TV-S 34287
 Harpsichord Concertos (Johann Georg Albrechtsberger, Carl Ditters von Dittersdorf, etc.) - led by Vilmos Tátrai - Vox/Turnabout TV-S 34325
 Franz Liszt: Complete Organ Works - Vox Box SVBX 5328-29

János Sebestyén participated in many recordings for Hungarian Radio.

Highlights:
 J. S. Bach: Six Sonatas for Violin and Harpsichord - with violinist György Pauk
 János Decsényi: Divertimento for Harpsichord and Chamber Orchestra - conducted by György Lehel
 Ferenc Farkas: Concertino for Harpsichord and Strings - conducted by György Lehel
 Frank Martin: Concerto for Harpsichord and Small Orchestra - conducted by György Lehel
 W. A. Mozart: Three Concertos after Johann Christian Bach - with members of the Tátrai Quartet
 Francis Poulenc: Concert champêtre - conducted by Tamás Bolberitz

References

External links 
 
 Sebestyén János (orgonaművész)
 Sebestyén János első aranykora
 Sebestyén János - csembalóművész
 Elhunyt Sebestyén János csembaló- és orgonaművész
 The harpsichordist János Sebestyén has died
 János Sebestyén: A Musical Silk Route in Budapest
 Egy rádiós élete a diktatúra éveiben

Hungarian harpsichordists
Hungarian classical pianists
Male classical pianists
Hungarian classical organists
Male classical organists
Musicians from Budapest
1931 births
2012 deaths
Hungarian Roman Catholics
Recipients of the Order of Isabella the Catholic
Artists of Merit of the Hungarian People's Republic
20th-century classical pianists
20th-century Hungarian male musicians